Nkomazi Local Municipality is a local municipality of South Africa, located in the Ehlanzeni District Municipality, Mpumalanga. Malalane is the seat of the municipality.

Main places
The 2001 census divided the municipality into the following main places:

Politics 

The municipal council consists of sixty-five members elected by mixed-member proportional representation. Thirty-three are elected by first-past-the-post voting in thirty-three wards, while the remaining thirty-two are chosen from party lists so that the total number of party representatives is proportional to the number of votes received. In the election of 1 November 2021 the African National Congress (ANC) won a majority of fifty seats on the council.

The following table shows the results of the 2021 election.

By-elections from November 2021
The following by-elections were held to fill vacant ward seats in the period from November 2021. A number of ANC councillors were expelled by the party after working with the Economic Freedom Fighters (EFF) to elect Johan Mkhatshwa, former mayor and the top-ranked ANC candidate on the proportional list, elected as mayor. The ANC candidates won both available seats in the August by-elections, although the party received less than 50% of the votes in ward 10. The EFF won the October by-election in ward 11, its first ward win in the province.

References

External links
Nkomazi Government site

Nkomazi municipality is home to giant processors of sugar cane the Selati Company and to various coal mines.The municipality has a gate to the country's biggest National park, The Kruger National Park.

Nkomazi Municipality serve as a link between  Mozambique and South Africa at the Lebombo border.There are also multiple border posts between South Africa and Swaziland.

2000 establishments in South Africa
Local municipalities of the Ehlanzeni District Municipality